The Victory Shield 2006 was the 61st edition of the Victory Shield, an annual football tournament competed for by the Under 16 level teams of England, Scotland, Northern Ireland and Wales. It was held from 13 October to 8 December 2006 and was won by England.

Venues

Final table

Results

The game was scheduled to take place at Bootham Crescent in York, but due a waterlogged pitch it game was played at Glanford Park.

Result

External links
Official Victory Shield website

2006
2006–07 in English football
2006–07 in Scottish football
2006–07 in Welsh football
2006–07 in Northern Ireland association football
October 2006 sports events in the United Kingdom
November 2006 sports events in the United Kingdom
December 2006 sports events in the United Kingdom